Paul Atlee Walker Sr. (January 11, 1881 – November 2, 1965) served as Chairman of the Federal Communications Commission from November 3, 1947, to December 28, 1947 (Acting), and again from February 28, 1952, to April 17, 1953.

References

Chairmen of the Federal Communications Commission
1881 births
1965 deaths
Truman administration personnel
Eisenhower administration personnel